UhaulCarShare (formerly "UCarShare") was a for-profit carsharing service offered by U-Haul in nearly 40 cities in the United States until the program was shut down in February 2020 just ahead of the COVID-19 pandemic. Those with a UhaulCarShare membership had use of a car, billable by the hour or by the day.  However, use was limited to three days at a time. Most often, Uhaul Car Share vehicles were operated in communities with colleges and/or universities nearby.  "The goal of [Uhaul] Car Share is to give people an alternative to owning second and third cars, and to increase the use of public transit."

UhaulCarShare's primary competitor was Zipcar (which, since 2007, includes the former Flexcar).

Renters were assigned a unique code that was entered into a lockbox located near the vehicle, which will allow them to gain access to the key for the vehicle.

References

External links
 Official website (archived) 

Carsharing
Car rental companies of the United States
Companies based in Phoenix, Arizona
Privately held companies based in Arizona